Kris Haddow (born Kris Clark on 24 June 1981) is a Scottish playwright, poet and performer, originally from Kirkconnel in Dumfries and Galloway.

Background
Born in Dumfriesshire in 1981, Kris was raised in the former mining village of Kirkconnel and schooled in neighbouring Sanquhar.  He moved to Paisley, Renfrewshire in 2000 with the ambition of pursuing acting as a career.  He spent ten years appearing in musicals and plays with various community theatre and profit share companies in Glasgow while working as a supporting artist with companies such as Scottish Ballet, the National Theatre of Scotland and BBC Scotland.

Kris graduated the University of Glasgow with an MLitt in Creative Writing with Merit in 2016. Prior to this, he had studied creative writing over several years at the Open University with a focus on writing for the stage. During this period, he started to produce a body of short stories and poems written in his native Lallans tongue, developing a passion for Scots language dialect representation. Kris returned to the OU in 2019/20 to complete the BA (Hons) Arts and Humanities with Creative Writing he had originally started, graduating with first-class honours. He is now a PhD research candidate at University of Glasgow on their DFA Creative Writing programme.

A classically trained baritone, Kris's voice was coached by two private tutors over an eight-year period. Though he received no formal acting training, he attended night schools at both the Royal Conservatoire of Scotland and the Citizens' Theatre, where he went on to appear as both musician and supporting artist in several studio and main stage productions.

Plays
His plays and monologues include The Bench (2009), Ronnie's Story (2010), 2h:9m:37s (2011) first produced for the Scottish Mental Health Arts and Film Festival, Make Your Move (2011) and A Not So Dirty Protest (2012) which were performed and broadcast live online as part of the National Theatre of Scotland's Five Minute Theatre events. He was mentored by the Playwrights' Studio, Scotland in 2011/12, and announced as one of the Traverse Fifty in 2013, where fifty emerging writers were selected to work with the Traverse Theatre as part of their 50th anniversary celebrations.

Awards
In April 2011 Kris was named winner of 'see me' Scotland's inaugural Creative Writing Award for his Scots language entry Ronnie's Story, judged by author Lari Don and awarded by Scots Makar Liz Lochhead.

In January 2012 "Windows for Burns Night" was launched by The Stove in Dumfries, inviting contemporary poets from around the world to write poems to be displayed in windows around the town after the fashion of Robert Burns, who famously scratched lines of verse using a diamond point pen. Kris's poem "On Times Austere" was announced as the winning submission, with an engraving of the poem in glass being permanently installed at The Globe Inn, Dumfries alongside replicas of Burns' original work.

In May 2021, it was announced in The Bookseller that Kris had made the shortlist for the North Lit Agency Prize with a work in progress tentatively titled When the Curlew Cries No More. Set in the South of Scotland, it is being developed as his first full length novel under the supervision of bestselling author Carolyn Jess-Cooke on the University of Glasgow's DFA Creative Writing programme. This book went on to win the Pitch Perfect event for emerging authors at the Bloody Scotland Crime Writing Festival in September 2021.

References

External links
Profile of Kris Haddow

1981 births
Scottish dramatists and playwrights
Scottish poets
Living people
People from Dumfries and Galloway